J. Robert Howie,  (October 2, 1929 – November 25, 2017) was a Canadian politician.

Career
Howie was a native of Fredericton and graduated from the University of New Brunswick. He served as a lawyer before his election to Parliament.

Political career
Howie was first elected to the House of Commons of Canada in the 1972 federal election as the Progressive Conservative Member of Parliament for York—Sunbury.

After the Tories won a minority government in the 1979 federal election, Howie was appointed to Cabinet as Minister of State for Transport in the short-lived government of Prime Minister Joe Clark. He returned to the Opposition as a result of the 1980 election that defeated the Tory government.

Howie returned to the government side of the House when the Brian Mulroney Tories won the 1984 federal election but was not invited into the Cabinet. He did not run in the 1988, and retired from politics.

Electoral history

Personal life
Howie and his wife Nancy had four children. He died in 2017 at the age of 88.

References

 

1929 births
2017 deaths
Members of the 21st Canadian Ministry
Members of the House of Commons of Canada from New Brunswick
Members of the King's Privy Council for Canada
Progressive Conservative Party of Canada MPs
People from Fredericton